Lagoudakis is a Greek family name which is derived from the Greek word λαγουδάκι (lagoudáki: diminutive of λαγός (lagós)) for "bunny." The genitive case form Lagoudakou (Λαγουδάκου) is applied to female name bearers.
Notable people with this name include:
 Pavlos Lagoudakis, Greek physicist
 Sokratis Lagoudakis (1861–1944), Greek long-distance runner

References 

Greek-language surnames
Surnames